The 1992–93 season was the 62nd season for Real Madrid C.F. in La Liga.

Summary
Real Madrid once again failed won the La Liga despite took a lead in late-May with a much effort thanks to Barcelona's several slips in the league. However Real Madrid once again tumbled in the season finale against Tenerife for the second season in a row.

After failed to won the league, Real Madrid once again settled for Copa del Rey as a consolation prize by defeating 2-0 against Real Zaragoza in late June. On the other hand, Real Madrid also suffered embarrassed UEFA Cup exit against Paris-Saint Germain in the quarter-finals.

Squad

Transfers

In

 from Sevilla FC
 from Real Madrid Castilla
 from FC Barcelona
 from Real Valladolid
 from Olympique Marseille (October)

Out

 to CF America
 to Brescia Calcio
 to Real Betis
 to Deportivo La Coruña
 to Real Burgos
 to Real Zaragoza (December)

Competitions

La Liga

League table

Results by round

Matches

Copa del Rey

Round of 16

Quarter-finals

Semi-finals

Final

UEFA Cup

First round

Second round

Third round

Quarter-finals

Statistics

Squad statistics

References

 Madrid – 1992–93 BDFutbol

Real
Real Madrid CF seasons